Ahad Miah (1955/1956 – 8 November 2021) was a Jatiya Party (Ershad) politician and a Jatiya Sangsad member representing  the Moulvibazar-4 constituency from 1988 to 1991.

Career
Miah was elected to parliament from Moulvibazar-4 as a Jatiya Party candidate in 1988.

References

1950s births
2021 deaths
People from Moulvibazar District
Year of birth uncertain
Jatiya Party politicians
4th Jatiya Sangsad members